Loudoun County is in the northern part of the Commonwealth of Virginia in the United States. In 2020, the census returned a population of 420,959, making it Virginia's third-most populous county. Loudoun County's seat is Leesburg. Loudoun County is part of the Washington–Arlington–Alexandria, DC–VA–MD–WV Metropolitan Statistical Area. As of 2020, Loudoun County had a median household income of $147,111. Since 2008, the county has been ranked first in the U.S. in median household income among jurisdictions with a population of 65,000 or more.



History
Loudoun County was established in 1757 from Fairfax County. The county is named for John Campbell, Fourth Earl of Loudoun and governor general of Virginia from 1756 to 1759. Western settlement began in the 1720s and 1730s with Quakers, Scots-Irish, Germans and others moving south from Pennsylvania and Maryland, and also by English and enslaved Africans moving upriver from Tidewater.

By the time of the American Revolution, it was Virginia's most populous county. It was also rich in agriculture, and the county's contributions of grain to George Washington's Continental Army earned it the nickname "Breadbasket of the Revolution."

During the War of 1812, important Federal documents and government archives were evacuated from Washington and stored at Leesburg.
Local tradition holds that these documents were stored at Rokeby House.

U.S. president James Monroe treated Oak Hill Plantation as a primary residence from 1823 until his death on July 4, 1831. The Loudoun County coat of arms and flag, granted by the English College of Arms, memorialize the special relationship between Britain and the United States that developed through his Monroe Doctrine.

Early in the American Civil War, the Battle of Balls Bluff took place near Leesburg on October 21, 1861. Future jurist Oliver Wendell Holmes Jr. was critically wounded in that battle along the Potomac River. During the Gettysburg Campaign in June 1863, Confederate major general J.E.B. Stuart and Union cavalry clashed in the battles of Aldie, Middleburg, and Upperville. Confederate partisan John S. Mosby based his operations in Loudoun and adjoining Fauquier County (for a more in-depth account of the history of Loudoun County during the Civil War, see Loudoun County in the American Civil War).

During World War I, Loudoun County was a major Breadbasket for supplying provisions to soldiers in Europe. Loudoun farmers implemented new agricultural innovations such as vaccination of livestock, seed inoculations and ensilage. The county experienced a boom in agricultural output, outputting an annual wheat output of 1.04 million bushels in 1917, the largest of any county in Virginia that year. 1.2 million units of home produce were produced at home, much of which went to training sites across the state such as Camp Lee. The Smith–Lever Act of 1914 established increased agricultural education in Virginia counties, increasing agricultural yields. After the war, a plaque was dedicated to the "30 glorious dead" from the county who died in the Great War. Five of the thirty died on the front, while the other twenty five died while in training or in other locations inside the United States.

In 1962, Washington Dulles International Airport was built in southeastern Loudoun County in Sterling. Since then, Loudoun County has experienced a high-tech boom and rapid growth. Accordingly, many have moved to eastern Loudoun and become residents of planned communities such as Sterling Park, Sugarland Run, Cascades, Ashburn Village, and Ashburn Farm, making that section a veritable part of the Washington suburbs. Others have moved to the county seat or to the small towns and rural communities of the Loudoun Valley.

Government and politics

Between 1952 and 2008, Loudoun was a Republican-leaning county. However, this has changed in recent years with Democrats winning all statewide campaigns after 2014, and Democrats holding a two-thirds majority on the county Board of Supervisors.

The county's official motto, I Byde My Time, is borrowed from the coat of arms of the Earl of Loudoun. In the mid to late 20th century, as northerners gradually migrated to Southern suburbs, Loudoun County increasingly shifted to the Republican Party in supporting presidential candidates, and more local ones. Before the 2008 election of Barack Obama, county voters had not supported a Democratic president since Lyndon B. Johnson in 1964.

In recent years, the county's rapid growth in its eastern portion, settled by educated professionals working in or near Washington, D.C., has changed the demographics of the county, and the Democratic Party has become increasingly competitive. After giving Senator Barack Obama nearly 54% of its presidential vote in 2008, the county supported Republican Bob McDonnell in 2009, who received 61% of the gubernatorial vote. Voters also replaced two incumbent Democratic delegates, making Loudoun's state House delegation all Republican. In 2012 county voters again supported Obama, who took 51.5% of the vote, with Republican challenger Mitt Romney garnering 47%.

Democrats carried the county again in the 2016 presidential election, when Loudoun swung heavily towards Hillary Clinton, giving her 55.1% to Donald Trump's 38.2%. In 2020, Joe Biden won 61.5% to Trump's 36.5%. A year later, in the 2021 Virginia gubernatorial election, Democratic candidate Terry McAuliffe won the county with 55.3% to now Governor Glenn Youngkin's 44.2%. Loudoun was one of ten counties that was won by McAuliffe, though it was his smallest margin of victory in Northern Virginia.

County Board of Supervisors
Like many counties in Virginia, Loudoun is locally governed by a board of supervisors, the Loudoun County Board of Supervisors. The chairman of the board is elected by county voters at-large while the remaining supervisors are elected from eight single-member districts roughly equal in population. All nine members serve concurrent terms of four years. The board handles policy and land use issues and sets the budget; it appoints a county administrator to handle the county government's day-to-day operations. As of the 2019 elections, the chairman of the board and five district supervisors are Democrats; the remaining three supervisors are Republican.

In November 2019, Democrats took over the Board of Supervisors. Voters elected Juli E. Briskman (D) in Algonkian District, with 6,763 votes (54.09%)  replacing incumbent Suzanne M. Volpe (R) who polled 5,719 votes (45.74%).  Juli Briskman had been fired from her job as a marketing analyst for a United States government and military subcontractor, after an AFP photo of her flipping off the motorcade of Donald Trump went viral on social media in 2017.

Geography

It is bounded on the north by the Potomac River; across the river are Frederick, Washington and Montgomery counties in Maryland; it is bounded on the south by Prince William and Fauquier counties, on the west by watershed of the Blue Ridge Mountain across which are Jefferson County, West Virginia and Clarke County, and on the east by Fairfax County. The Bull Run Mountains and Catoctin Mountain bisect the county. To the west of the range is the Loudoun Valley. Bisecting the Loudoun Valley from Hillsboro to the Potomac River is Short Hill Mountain.

Adjacent counties

National protected area
 Harpers Ferry National Historical Park

Economy
Traditionally a rural county, Loudoun's population has grown dramatically since the 1980s. Having undergone heavy suburbanization since 1990, Loudoun has a full-fledged service economy. It is home to world headquarters for several Internet-related and high tech companies, including Verizon Business, Telos Corporation, Orbital Sciences Corporation, and Paxfire.  Like Fairfax County's Dulles Corridor, Loudoun County has economically benefited from the existence of Washington Dulles International Airport, the majority of which is in the county along its border with Fairfax.

Loudoun County retains a strong rural economy. The equine industry has an estimated revenue of $78 million. It is home to the Morven Park International Equestrian Center which hosts national horse trials. In addition, a growing wine industry has produced several internationally recognized wines. Loudoun County now has 40 wineries and over 25 active farms. Loudoun has rich soil and was in the mid-19th century a top wheat-producing county in the fourth largest wheat-producing state.

MCI, Inc. (formerly WorldCom), a subsidiary of Verizon Communications, is headquartered in Ashburn, Loudoun County. It announced it would move its headquarters to Ashburn in 2003. AOL had its headquarters at 22000 AOL Way in Dulles in unincorporated Loudoun County. In 2007 AOL announced it would move its headquarters from Loudoun County to New York City; it would continue to operate its Virginia offices. Orbital Sciences Corporation has its headquarters in Dulles.

Loudoun County houses over 60 massive data centers, many of which correspond to Amazon Web Services’s (AWS) us-east-1 region. These data centers are estimated to carry 70 percent of global web traffic.

Before its dissolution, Independence Air (originally Atlantic Coast Airlines) was headquartered in Dulles. At one time Atlantic Coast Airlines had its headquarters in Sterling. Before its dissolution, MAXjet Airways was headquartered on the grounds of Washington-Dulles International Airport.

Top employers
According to the county's comprehensive annual financial reports, the top employers in the county are:

{| class="wikitable sortable" border="1"
|-
! #
! Employer
! # of employees (2020)<ref>[https://www.loudoun.gov/DocumentCenter/View/163183/Fiscal-Year-2020-Comprehensive-Annual-Financial-Report Loudon County, Virginia: Comprehensive Annual Fiscal Report, Year Ended June 30, 2020], p. 217 (table N).</ref> 
! # of employees (2011) 
|-
|1
|Loudoun County Public Schools
|11,995
|10,098
|-
|2
|County of Loudoun
|4,125
|3,303
|-
|3
|Verizon Business (formerly MCI Worldcom)
|2,500-5,000
|1,000-5,000
|-
|4
|United Airlines
|1,000-5,000
|1,000-5,000
|-
|5
|U.S. Department of Homeland Security
|1,000–5,000
|1,000–5,000
|-
|6
|Northrop Grumman Innovation Systems (formerly Orbital ATK)
|1,000–5,000
|1,000–5,000
|-
|7
|Raytheon Technologies 
|1,000–5,000
|1,000–5,000
|-
|8
|Inova Health System (Loudoun Hospital Center)
|1,000–5,000
|1,000–5,000
|-
|9
|Amazon
|1,000–2,500
|—
|-
|10
|Swissport USA, Inc.
|1,000–2,500
|—
|-
|—
|America Online
|—
|1,000–5,000
|-
|—
|United States Postal Service
|—
|1,000–5,000
|-
|—
|M.C. Dean, Inc.
|1,000–5,000
|1,000–5,000
|}

Demographics

From 1890 to 1940, the county had a decline in population as people moved to cities for more opportunities. The decline was likely highest among African Americans, who had worked in an agricultural economy that was becoming increasingly mechanized. During the first half of the 20th century, African Americans moved out of rural areas to cities in the Great Migration. As of the early 21st century, African Americans now have a much smaller population compared to their historical population in Loudoun County, with the Hispanic and Asian populations outnumbering them 2-1 and 3-1 respectively.

2020 censusNote: the US Census treats Hispanic/Latino as an ethnic category. This table excludes Latinos from the racial categories and assigns them to a separate category. Hispanics/Latinos can be of any race.2010 Census
As of the census of 2010, there were 312,311 people, 104,583 households, and 80,494 families residing in the county. The racial makeup of the county was:
 68.7% White
 14.7% Asian (7.90% Indian, 1.74% Filipino, 1.61% Chinese, 1.34% Korean, 1.22% Vietnamese, 1.09% Pakistani)
 7.3% African American
 0.3% Native American
 0.1% Pacific Islander
 4.9% of some other race
 4.0% of two or more races
 12.4% of the population were Hispanic or Latino of any race (3.4% Salvadoran, 1.8% Mexican, 1.3% Peruvian, 0.9% Puerto Rican, 0.6% Honduran, 0.6% Bolivian, 0.5% Guatemalan, 0.5% Colombian)

According to the 2010 census, 10.5% of residents reported being of German ancestry, while 9.1% reported Irish, 7.7% English, 5.4% Italian and 5.2% American ancestry.

The most spoken languages other than English in Loudoun County as of 2018 were Spanish, spoken by 10.8% of the population, and Telugu, spoken by 2.8% of the population. Almost 25% of Loudoun County residents were born outside of the United States, with the largest groups being from India, El Salvador, and Korea.

As of 2000 there were 59,900 households, out of which 43.10% had children under the age of 18 living with them, 64.30% were married couples living together, 7.80% had a female householder with no husband present, and 24.80% were non-families. 18.40% of all households were made up of individuals, and 3.70% had someone living alone who was 65 years of age or older.  The average household size was 2.82 and the average family size was 3.24.

In the county, the population was spread out, with 29.80% under the age of 18, 5.70% from 18 to 24, 38.90% from 25 to 44, 20.00% from 45 to 64, and 5.60% who were 65 years of age or older.  The median age was 34 years. For every 100 females, there were 97.80 males.  For every 100 females age 18 and over, there were 95.50 males.

In 2011, Census survey data concluded that Loudoun County had the highest median income in the country at $119,134.

From 1980 to 2014, deaths from cancer in Loudoun County decreased by 46 percent, the largest such decrease of any county in the United States.

From 2017 to 2018, Loudoun County saw an increase of 18.5% of households experiencing homelessness, a 21% increase for single adults, and a 36% increase for families. Homelessness for veterans in the county decreased by 16% from 2017 to 2018.

Government and infrastructure

The National Transportation Safety Board operates the Ashburn Aviation Field Office in Ashburn, an unincorporated area of Loudoun County. The Federal Aviation Administration's Washington Air Route Traffic Control Center, the second-busiest facility of its kind in the nation, is located in Leesburg.

Emergency services are provided by the Loudoun County Fire and Rescue Department with the Office of Emergency Management. LCFR is a combination system that utilizes some 500 volunteers and over 600 career firefighters, EMT/paramedics, dispatchers, and support staff. LCFR is one of the largest fire and rescue systems in Virginia.

Law enforcement in Loudoun County is provided by the Loudoun County Sheriff's Office, which is Virginia's largest sheriff's office, as well as three town police departments: Leesburg Police, Purcellville Police, and Middleburg Police. The county's highways are also patrolled by Virginia State Police troopers. Dulles Airport and the Dulles Toll Road are patrolled by the Metropolitan Washington Airports Authority Police Department.

The Loudoun County Public Library System has eleven branches in the county. The library's Outreach Department of the Loudoun County Public Library is a resource for those who cannot easily access branch services. The public library system has won several awards, including 10th place for libraries serving a comparably sized population in 2006

Loudon County is one of the counties in Virginia that elects to cover their employees in the Virginia Mortgage Assistance Program (VMAP). The program is designed to make housing more affordable for civil service workers in Virginia.

Transportation

Airports

Loudoun County has two airports: Washington Dulles International and Leesburg Executive.

Bus
Loudoun County operates its own bus public transit system, known as Loudoun County Commuter Bus.

Rail
The Silver Line of the Washington Metro provides service at the Dulles Airport, Loudoun Gateway, and Ashburn stations.

Major highways

Education
The county is served by Loudoun County Public Schools (LCPS). LCPS serves over 70,000 students from Kindergarten through 12th grade and is Virginia's fifth largest school system.2005 Triennial school census , Virginia Department of Education Loudoun County schools recently ranked 11th in the United States in terms of educational achievement versus funds spent. Loudoun County also sends students to its Loudoun Academy of Science, formerly housed within Dominion High School now within the Academies of Loudoun, and is eligible to send students to Thomas Jefferson High School for Science and Technology, a STEM magnet school in Alexandria, Virginia.

Loudoun County is home to ten private schools: Loudoun Country Day School, a Pre-K–8 independent school in Leesburg; Notre Dame Academy, an independent non-denominational day high school in Middleburg; the Foxcroft School, a boarding school for girls located in Middleburg; Dominion Academy, a Non-denominational Christian school, K–8 in Leesburg; Loudoun Classical School, a Protestant classical 7th-12th grade school in Purcellville; Leesburg Christian School, a K–12 school in Leesburg; St. Theresa School, a K–8 Roman Catholic school in Ashburn; Village Montessori School at Bluemont, an accredited Pre-K through Elementary Montessori school in Bluemont; Christian Faith & Fellowship School, a PreK–12 non-denominational Christian school and Loudoun County's only private school accredited by the Association of Christian Schools International; and Loudoun School for Advanced Studies (formerly the Ideal Schools High School,) an independent non-denominational school in Ashburn.

In terms of post-secondary education, Loudoun County is home to a variety of colleges and universities, including: Patrick Henry College, a private Christian college; Northern Virginia Community College in Sterling (branch campus); George Washington University (satellite campus); George Mason University (satellite campus); Marymount University (satellite campus); Shenandoah University (satellite campus); and Strayer University (satellite campus).  Loudoun is also home to a satellite campus of the Virginia–Maryland College of Veterinary Medicine and the Janelia Farm Research Campus of the Howard Hughes Medical Institute.

Communities
Towns

 Hamilton
 Hillsboro
 Leesburg (county seat)
 Lovettsville
 Middleburg
 Purcellville
 Round Hill

Census-designated places

 Aldie
 Arcola
 Ashburn
 Belmont
 Brambleton
 Broadlands
 Cascades
 Countryside
 Dulles Town Center
 Goose Creek Village
 Kincora
 Lansdowne
 Loudoun Valley Estates
 Lowes Island
 Moorefield
 Oak Grove
 One Loudoun
 South Riding
 Sterling
 Stone Ridge
 Sugarland Run
 University Center
 Waterford

Other unincorporated communities

 Airmont
 Bloomfield
 Bluemont
 Britain
 Conklin
 Dover
 Dulles
 Elvan
 Eubanks
 Georges Mill
 Gilberts Corner
 Gleedsville
 Howardsville
 Leithtown
 Lenah
 Lincoln
 Loudoun Heights
 Lucketts
 Morrisonville
 Mount Gilead
 Neersville
 Paeonian Springs
 Paxson
 Philomont
 Potomac Falls
 Potomac Green
 Randolph Corner
 River Creek
 Ryan
 Saint Louis
 Scattersville
 Silcott Spring
 Stewartown
 Stumptown
 Taylorstown
 Telegraph Spring
 Trapp
 Unison
 Watson
 Waxpool
 Wheatland
 Willard
 Willisville
 Woodburn

 Population ranking 
The population ranking of the following table is based on 2018 estimates by the United States Census Bureau.

† county seatNotable people

James Monroe constructed and resided at Oak Hill near Aldie after his presidency. American Civil War Brigadier General Robert H. Chilton (Chief of Staff under Robert E. Lee) was a native of Loudoun County. World War II general George C. Marshall resided at Dodona Manor in Leesburg. Essayist and journalist Russell Baker grew up in Morrisonville, Virginia and his book Growing Up highlights his childhood in rural Virginia. Entertainer Arthur Godfrey lived near historic Waterford, Virginia. Loudoun County is also the birthplace of Julia Neale Jackson, mother of Stonewall Jackson, and Susan Catherine Koerner Wright, mother of the Wright Brothers.
 Madeleine Albright (1937–2022) – U.S. Secretary of State in Clinton Administration
 William H. Ash (1859–1908) – Former slave who was one of the first African-American politicians to be elected to the Virginia House of Delegates
 Russell Baker (1925–2019) – Pulitzer Prize-winning author of Growing Up (1983, Autobiography)
 Geraldine Brooks (1955–) – Pulitzer Prize–winning author
 John Champe – Revolutionary War soldier and double agent
 Roger Preston Chew, (1843-1921) – Horse artillery commander in the Confederate Army of Northern Virginia, prominent West Virginia businessman, railroad executive and West Virginia legislator
 John L. Dagg (1794–1884) – Baptist theologian, pastor, educator, and president of Mercer University, GA (1844–54)"John Leadley Dagg 1844-1854 Mercer University Presidents" 
 Westmoreland Davis (1859–1942) – Governor of Virginia
 Richard Henry Dulany (1820–1906) – Colonel of the 7th Virginia Cavalry during the Civil War
 Michael Farris (born 1951) – Founder of Home School Legal Defense Association and Patrick Henry College in Purcellville; unsuccessful Republican nominee for Lieutenant Governor of Virginia in 1993
 Joe Gibbs (1940–) – Lived just west of Leesburg while coaching the Washington Redskins
 Arthur Godfrey (1903–1983) – Popular national radio and television personality
 Darrell Green (1960–) – Former Washington Redskin and inductee to the NFL Pro Football Hall of Fame
 Pamela Harriman (1920–1997) – Daughter-in-law of Sir Winston Churchill and U.S. Ambassador to France
 Gina Haspel (1956–) – Director of the CIA, first female ever appointed to the position
 Annia Hatch (1978–) – Cuban American 2x Olympic silver medalist in gymnastics, currently lives in Ashburn
 Fred Hetzel (1942–) – Former professional basketball player
 Barbara Holland (1933–2010) – author
 Tony Horwitz (1958–2019) – Pulitzer Prize–winning author
 John Janney (1798–1872) – Member of the Virginia General Assembly and officer of the Virginia Secession Convention of 1861
 Sheila Johnson (1949–) – Entertainment and sports entrepreneur and philanthropist.
 Wilton Lackaye (1862-1932) – American stage and film actor, the original Broadway stage Svengali, 1895
 Lyndon LaRouche (1921–2019) – Controversial American politician, activist, and founder of the LaRouche movement
 Marc Leepson (1945–) – Journalist, historian, author
 Sandra Lerner (c. 1953–) – Entrepreneur and philanthropist
 Mark Levin (1957–) – Author and conservative talk radio host
 George C. Marshall (1880–1959) – General of the Army (5-star), U.S. Secretary of State, Secretary of Defense, and author of the "Marshall Plan"
 Stevens T. Mason (1811–1843) – First governor of Michigan (Democrat, 1837–40)
 Andrew McCabe (1968–) – Former Deputy Director of the FBI
 Charles F. Mercer (1788–1858) – Founded village of Aldie; U.S. Congressman from Virginia
 Billy Mitchell (1879–1936) – Controversial Army officer and military aviation pioneer
 James Monroe (1758–1831) – 5th President of the United States
 Oliver North (1943–) – Former USMC Officer and figure in the Iran–Contra scandal; commentator and host on the Fox network
 Patton Oswalt (1969–) – American stand-up comedian, writer and actor
Vinton Liddell Pickens (1900–1993) – artist, chair of the first Loudoun County planning commission in 1941
 Wilson Pickett (1941–2006) – R&B and soul singer and songwriter
 Isaiah L. Potts (1784?–after 1843) – tavern keeper of the notorious Potts Tavern who, allegedly, ran a gang of highwaymen and murderers on the Illinois frontier
 Rachel Renee Russell (1959–) – #1 New York Times'' best-selling author of the children's book series, Dork Diaries
 Henry S. Taylor (1942–) – Pulitzer Prize-winning poet
 Joshua White (1812–1890) – businessman and Illinois state legislator
 Lucien Whiting Powell (1846–1930) – Renowned landscape artist
 William Wilson (1794–1857) – Chief Justice of the Supreme Court of Illinois

See also

Loudoun Water
Loudoun v. Board of Trustees of the Loudoun County Library
National Register of Historic Places listings in Loudoun County, Virginia
List of wineries in Virginia

Explanatory notes

References

External links

 
 Loudoun County Chamber of Commerce
  Travel Information: Loudoun Convention & Visitors Association

 

 
Virginia counties
Northern Virginia counties
Virginia counties on the Potomac River
Washington metropolitan area
States and territories established in 1757
1750s establishments in Virginia
1757 establishments in the Thirteen Colonies